This is a list of hexapod robots.

 
Hexapods